The Morris Isis name was first briefly used by Morris Motors Limited on a 6-cylinder car made from 1929 until 1931. It was resurrected on a new 6-cylinder midsize car from the British Motor Corporation in the 1950s to replace the Morris Six MS.

The name was discontinued in 1958.

Morris Isis (1929–35) and Twenty Five (1933–35)

The Isis announced in July 1929 was a revised version of the 1927 Morris Six JA series and used the same 2468 cc engine and 3-speed gearbox. It had an all-new chassis, and the steel body had an American look, not surprising, as the body pressing dies made by Budd for the Morris-Budd joint venture, Pressed Steel Company, were shared with some Dodge models. William Morris had recognised the potential of pressed steel car bodies and introduced them to Europe in Pressed Steel Company, a joint venture with Budd, sited beside William Morris's Cowley plant.

It was the first Morris to have hydraulic brakes and chromium plating replaced the previous nickel finish on brightwork.

The car could exceed  and return .

Facelift
After 3,939 of the original Isis model had been made it received a facelift announced 1 September 1932.  Following the court-forced separation of William Morris from his joint venture with Edward G Budd the all-steel body was replaced by a traditional wood-frame construction. Mechanically the car was similar but the gearbox received syncromesh and a fourth speed (Twin-Top), the chassis received additional cross bracing in 1934 and an automatic clutch and freewheel were fitted to some models. 3,467 of the new Isis were made (including Twenty-Five models).

Morris Twenty-Five
A de-luxe version, the Morris Twenty-Five was launched 12 October 1932 for the 1932 London Motor Show with larger 3485 cc engine. It was replaced in July 1935 by a new Twenty-Five, the flagship of the Morris Big Six series II range, and given an overhead valve engine (as the series III) in August 1938 with the rest of the Morris range.

Isis Series I (1955–56)

The Series I Isis was launched in 1955 as a replacement for the Morris Six MS.  It featured a 6-cylinder engine, the 2.6 L (2639 cc/161 in³),  C-Series unit from the Austin Westminster.  Unlike the Westminster, the Isis had a single SU carburettor. The 4-speed gearbox had a column change and was available with an optional Borg-Warner overdrive unit.

The car was based on the 4-cylinder Morris Oxford series II, sharing its almost-unibody shell and torsion bar front suspension.  The wheelbase and front end were lengthened to accept the larger straight-6 engine, and a "woody" 2-door estate version was also available.  With the strong engine, the Isis could reach 90 mph (145 km/h).

Unlike its sister car, the Austin Westminster, which enjoyed moderate success against the volume-selling Ford and Vauxhall sixes of the time, sales were poor, with only 8,500 sold.

Isis Series II (1956–58)

The Morris Isis Series II was based on the Morris Oxford Series III body but with longer wheelbase and front wings and bonnet to accommodate the 6-cylinder engine.

In line with changes to the corresponding Oxford line, BMC redesigned the Isis for 1956 with updated styling including a more elaborate mesh grille, chrome side strips and small fins. An automatic transmission option was also added. The manual version had a four-speed box operated by a short gearstick on the right-hand side of the front bench seat. The handbrake lever was just behind the gearstick. Sales remained weak, and the line ended in 1958.

The test car cost £1025 including taxes. The overdrive unit had added £63 to the price.

There was also a Traveller version with similar rear design to the Morris Oxford Estate car. The Isis Traveller accommodated the spare wheel either within the rear well or, when it was required to use this region for a passenger (the small floor area was hinged with a padded underside so that the passenger faced "backwards"), then the spare would be attached to the nearside, again to the rear of the vehicle. In this way it would be possible to accommodate two adult passengers on the front bench seat next to the driver, three in the middle rear bench seat and one in the very back.

References

Isis
Rear-wheel-drive vehicles
Mid-size cars
Sedans
Station wagons
Cars introduced in 1929
1930s cars
Cars introduced in 1955